Aminobacter aganoensis is a bacterium from the genus of Aminobacter which was isolated from soil.

References

External links
Type strain of Aminobacter aganoensis at BacDive -  the Bacterial Diversity Metadatabase

Phyllobacteriaceae
Bacteria described in 1992